Tour Ève (previously known as Tour PH21) is an office and apartments skyscraper in Puteaux, in La Défense, the business district of the Paris metropolitan area.

Built in 1974, this 109 m skyscraper belongs to the second generation of skyscrapers in La Défense. It is also the 4th tallest residential building in the business district, after the Tour Les Poissons, the Tour Défense 2000 and the Tour France.

It contains 321 apartments and 7,000 m2 of offices.

See also 
 La Défense
 List of tallest buildings and structures in the Paris region
 List of tallest buildings in France

References

External links 
 Tour Ève

Eve
La Défense
Office buildings completed in 1974
20th-century architecture in France